Common names: (none).
Bothrops taeniatus lichenosus is a venomous pitviper subspecies endemic to South America and known only from one locality in Bolívar State, Venezuela.

Description
Same as for B. t. taeniatus, except that B. t. lichenosus has fewer ventral scales and fewer subcaudal scales.

Geographic range
It is found in South America and known only from the type locality, which is "Chimantá Tepui, Estado Bolívar, Venezuela".

References

External links
 

taeniatus lichenosus
Snakes of South America
Reptiles of Venezuela
Endemic fauna of Venezuela
Reptiles described in 1958
Fauna of the Tepuis